Otep is an American alternative metal band. The band was formed in November 2000 in Los Angeles, California, by frontwoman Otep Shamaya. The band is noted for their style of "art-house nu metal", and their strong political stances. Throughout the course of several lineup changes over the years, Shamaya has remained the only constant member in the band.

After being selected by Sharon Osbourne to appear at Ozzfest 2001, Otep was signed to a record deal with Capitol Records without a demo in March 2001. Otep released two albums through Capitol, Sevas Tra (2002) and House of Secrets (2004); both albums were moderate successes, and sold a combined total of 400,000 copies worldwide by 2006. Otep's third album, The Ascension, was due to be released through Capitol in March 2007, but was delayed indefinitely following the label's consolidation into Capitol Music Group two months prior to its planned release date; the band subsequently parted ways with the label, and the album was eventually issued through Koch Records in October of that year.

In February 2009, Otep signed with Victory Records. The band issued three albums through the label; Smash the Control Machine (2009), which saw a reunion of the band's Sevas Tra lineup, Atavist (2011) and Hydra (2013), a concept album. Hydra was intended to be the band's final album, but thereafter Otep Shamaya opted to continue the band, and Otep have since released two more albums, both through Napalm Records; Generation Doom (2016) and Kult 45 (2018). They are currently signed with Cleopatra Records, and are planning on releasing a new album in 2023.

History

Early years, Jihad and Sevas Tra (2000–2003)
Otep began as a band in Los Angeles, California, in November 2000. They were invited to play Ozzfest before they had signed to a label after Sharon Osbourne witnessed their fourth live performance. They have since played Ozzfest several times. Otep signed with Capitol Records after four shows and without a demo, purely on the power of their live performance. They started gigging around Los Angeles a lot and released the Jihad EP in June 2001. After performing at Ozzfest, Marsh and Aguilera were fired, with both guitarists being replaced by Rob Patterson for the rest of the tours that year.

The band released their album Sevas Tra with Terry Date on June 18, 2002, and then played several gigs at the Ozzfest and was considered one of the prime bands there in 2002. Their first time at Ozzfest was in 2001 with their eighth gig. The first album peaked at 145 on the Billboard 200 and 86 on the UK Albums Chart.

House of Secrets (2004–2006)
On July 27, 2004, Otep released their second album, House of Secrets, produced by Greg Wells. The album peaked at 93 on the Billboard 200 and 102 on the French Chart.

The Ascension (2007–2008)
After three years of touring, the band created a third album The Ascension, with a scheduled release date of March 20, 2007. In preparation of its original release, they toured with Static-X starting in the spring of 2007.

However, the album was delayed indefinitely due to the Capitol Music Group merger in January 2007. The merger led to the firing of the label's president and the band's A&R representative from the label, and Otep was left in limbo whether to stay at the label or find a new one; they were eventually dropped from Capitol in May 2007.

In September 2007, the band was able to ink a deal with Koch Records, who belatedly released The Ascension in October. Upon its release, It peaked at 81 on the Billboard 200 and 6 on the US Independent Charts. The album sold about 10,200 album copies in its first week of release.

Smash the Control Machine (2009–2010)
In 2009, Otep signed with Victory Records. Their 2009 album, Smash the Control Machine, which was released on August 18, 2009, included a reunion with former members Mark "Moke" Bistany on drums and Rob Patterson on guitar. The album also featured Koichi Fukuda on piano, and Emilie Autumn on violin, and a song co-written with songwriter Holly Knight, which resulted in "UR a WMN NOW". Knight previously co-wrote "Perfectly Flawed" with Otep on The Ascension. It peaked at 47 on the Billboard 200 and 6 on the US Independent Charts.

The band appeared with 2Cents, Five Finger Death Punch and Shadows Fall on the 'Shock & Raw Tour' of North America in the fall of 2009.

On September 30, 2010, bassist Jay McGuire left the band.

Atavist and Sounds Like Armageddon (2011–2012)
On April 26, 2011, Otep released their fifth studio album, Atavist. It peaked at 61 on the Billboard 200, 10 on the Independent Charts and 19 on the US Rock Charts.

On November 6, 2012, Otep released their first live album, Sounds Like Armageddon.

Hydra and further activity (2013-2014)
In an interview, Otep Shamaya stated that Hydra will be her band's final album. The album was released on January 22, 2013 and peaked at 133 on the Billboard 200.

The band is still touring and have tours in places such as the US's east coast and Australia for their Sounds of Armageddon tour.

In early 2014, Otep confirmed on her personal Facebook account and the band account that another album would be made.

In April 2014, Otep signed a new management deal with Kam 9.8 Machlation Group, a company founded by Slipknot's DJ Sid Wilson and his business partner Synonym Mead. The contract with Kam 9.8 was not renewed. In September 2015 Otep announced on her Facebook page that the band had signed a new management deal with Napalm Records, and that a new album would be released in the spring of 2016 (pre-order from winter 2015).

Generation Doom (2015-2017)
"Signing with Napalm Records is one of the most exciting alliances I've ever made. I haven't felt this excited to write a new album since 'Sevas Tra.' There's a lot of work to do, a lot of music to write, a lot of things to say, a lot of injustices to confront and a lot of madness to summon and capture. To be able to forge this sacred alchemy with the dark brilliance of producer Howard Benson is a dream come true."

On February 4, 2016, Otep announced that the album would be titled Generation Doom and would be released on April 15. They also released the album art on their Facebook page.

On April 11, 2016 Billboard was to stream Generation Doom in its entirety for 24 hours, but due to its success extended the streaming time to several days.

The music video for the song "In Cold Blood" premiered on April 15, 2016, on Music Choice.

On Record Store Day (April 16, 2016), record stores released a picture vinyl disk of Generation Doom.

On April 20, Napalm Records released the video for "In Cold Blood" on their YouTube page.

Generation Doom sold 5,825 copies in its first week of sale in the United States. It was number 3 of the top 8 Napalm Record sellers in the week of April 23. On April 26 the album reached #7 on the Billboard Rock Chart, #10 on the Independent Chart and #109 on the Top 200 Albums Chart. On May 7, the album reached #4 on the Billboard Hard Rock Chart

Kult 45 (2018–present)
On May 2, 2018, Otep disclosed the album title and artwork for their eighth album, together with disclosing interviews about the content of the album. The official Napalm announcement read: "You can expect a complete and total mutiny of the senses on Kult 45," says Shamaya. "That said, it's important for fans to know that this record is not just an indictment of Trump. The idea is rather to empower people to stand up and remind them this is our country and we have the power. It's primarily a rallying cry for people with common sense and good-natured patriots to rise up and know that we own this nation."

"Although the album is produced well technically, lyrically, it's very raw. Musically, we explore different genres – we're trying to reach everyone. I don't want to be limited to one genre or to be anchored to a particular space where I can only reach certain political minds. It's important to me that I'm sending a clear and concise message to the Resistance - the people out there bending the barricades and fighting for justice is this country."

Kult 45 was recorded at The Lair in Los Angeles, completely utilizing the same equipment used for OTEP's first album, Sevas Tra (down to Shamaya's vocal microphone, a SHURE Beta 58), in order to create a sound reminiscent of their roots. Kult 45 was self-produced by the band, with assistant engineering from Larry Goetz, Nicolas Schilke and Lizzy Ostro.
It was also mentioned that the lyrics will tackle subjects like the immigrant crisis, rape culture and the US government.

In an episode of 'Wake and Bake' (a weekly Facebook live stream on the Otep page) Justin Kier said that while creating this album the band had kept the fans in mind. Therefore, making it an album for the fans, rather than for self-exploration.

The first single of the album, "To the Gallows",  was released on May 25, 2018, along with a lyric video. The album sold 1,850 copies in its first week, and became Otep's first studio album not to chart on the Billboard 200.

Musical style and influences
The band's style is primarily nu metal, and is also considered alternative metal. It has also been labelled as gothic metal, rap metal and extreme metal. AllMusic has described Otep as "art house nu-metal". Otep's influences include Slipknot, Slayer, Korn, Rage Against the Machine, The Notorious B.I.G., Nine Inch Nails, Jim Morrison, Tool, the Doors, Nirvana, and Deftones. While the band's style is primarily nu metal, their music incorporates strong elements of death metal.

Awards
In 2004, the music video for the single "Warhead" was on the top ten of MTV Headbangers Ball.

In 2010, Otep was nominated for a GLAAD Media Award for "Outstanding Music Artist" for the album Smash the Control Machine during the 21st GLAAD Media Awards.

Beginning with The Ascension and continuing through to Generation Doom, Otep has consistently charted high, most often in the top five on the Billboard Hard Rock Chart.

Band members

Current members
 Otep Shamaya – vocals (2000–present)

Former members

 Tarver Marsh – guitar (2000)
 Dave "Spooky" Aguilera – guitars (2000–2001)
 Mark "Moke" Bistany – drums (2000–2003, 2009)
 Rob Patterson – guitars (2001–2004, 2009)
 Jason "eViL J" McGuire – bass (2000–2010)
 Karma Singh Cheema – guitar (2006–2007)
 Brian "Haggis" Wolff – drums (2006–2008)
 Justin Kier – drums (2013–2020)
 "Ari Mihalopoulos" – guitar  (2011)
 "Andrew Barnes" – bass  (2016)
 "Lamar Little" – drums (2020–2022)
 "Aj Bartholomew" – guitars (2022) 

Touring musicians

 Lane Maverick – guitar  (2001)
 Lee Rios – guitar  (2004)
 Scotty CH – guitar (2005)
 Melissa DeGott – guitar (2006)
 Aaron Nordstrom – guitar  (2007–2008)
 Steven Barbola – guitar (2008–2010)
 Scot Coogan – drums (2003)
 David Lopez – drums (2004)
 Doug Pellerin – drums (2004–2005)
 Dave Gentry – drums (2008–2010)
 Chasin Cox – drums (2010)
 Joe Fox – drums (2011)
 Chase Brickenden – drums (2012)
 Erik Tisinger – bass (2011–2013)
 Corey Wolford – bass (2014–2015)
 "Aj Bartholomew" – guitar (2022)

Timeline

Discography

Albums

Studio albums

Live albums

Extended plays

Singles

Promotional singles

References

External links
Otep official site
"Otep's Next Step," by Niki D'Andrea, Phoenix New Times
[ Hard Rock Albums Charts] on Billboard

American alternative metal musical groups
Capitol Records artists
2000 establishments in California
EMI Records artists
Musical groups established in 2000
Musical quartets
Nu metal musical groups from California
Rap metal musical groups
Victory Records artists